Scoundrel is a thriller book written by English author Bernard Cornwell. The story of the book is set in Europe, in 1990, just after the Iraqi invasion of Kuwait. It features Paul (Paulie) Shanahan, a Bostonian, who had moved to Europe in his role a member of the Provisional Irish Republican Army (PIRA). In his recent past, a woman, Roisin, had been caught by the Libyans, and found out as a Central Intelligence Agency (CIA) operative. Under the torture, and shortly before her execution, she had claimed Paul Shanhaan was also a sleeper member of the CIA. As such, all his terrorist contacts had shunned him, expecting him to return to the United States, as his cover was blown. As the story begins, he has been in the cold for three years, when he is contacted by an old Libyan contact, with a job for him.

The job, on the face of it, is to sail a boat carrying five million dollars of Libyan gold, to Miami, to allow the PIRA to give it as payment to the Cubans, in exchange for fifty-two Stinger missiles. However, as the project pans out, Shannan becomes suspicious that the project is not what it seems.

Publishing information 
 December 2004:  Mass Market Paperback: 336 pages HarperTorch; First THUS edition (English) 

British thriller novels
British historical novels
2004 British novels